Fonderie Typographique Française was a French type foundry.  Founded in Paris in 1921 following the merger of the Turlot, Durey & Berthier, Renault & Marcou, Huart, Chaix, and Saling type foundries.  In 1969 it moved to Champigny-sur-Marne and took the name “Société Nouvelle de la Fonderie Typographique Française.”  Sold in 1974 to the Fundición Tipográfica Neufville, in Barcelona

Typefaces
These foundry types were produced by Fonderie Typographique Française:

References

Metal companies of France
Letterpress font foundries of France
Manufacturing companies based in Paris